Lucas Figueiredo dos Santos (born 14 August, 2001), known as just Figueiredo, is a Brazilian professional footballer who plays as a forward for Vasco da Gama.

References

External links

2001 births
Living people
Brazilian footballers
Association football forwards
CR Vasco da Gama players
Campeonato Brasileiro Série B players
Sportspeople from Niterói